John Rune "Jompa" Eriksson (12 March 1929 – 24 March 2020) was a Swedish footballer and manager who most notably played as a forward for Djurgårdens IF. A full international between 1951 and 1955, he won ten caps for the Sweden national team and scored nine goals.

Club career
Eriksson made his senior team debut for Värtans IK in 1948. He moved to Djurgården and made his debut in a 3–1 win against GAIS on 29 July 1951. With Djurgården, he won the Allsvenskan in 1954–55 and 1959.

International career 
He made his international debut in the 1948–51 Nordic Football Championship match against Finland national football team. In total, he made ten appearances and scored nine goals.

Management career
After his Djurgårdens years, Eriksson became playing manager for Vällingby AIK. Later, he was manager for IF Brommapojkarna.

Honours 

 Djurgårdens IF
 Allsvenskan: 1954–55, 1959

References

1929 births
2020 deaths
Swedish footballers
Sweden international footballers
Allsvenskan players
Värtans IK players
Djurgårdens IF Fotboll players
IF Brommapojkarna managers
Association football forwards
Swedish football managers
Footballers from Stockholm